Cayley may refer to:


People
 Cayley (surname)
 Cayley Illingworth (1759–1823), Anglican Archdeacon of Stow
 Cayley Mercer (born 1994), Canadian women's ice hockey player

Places
 Cayley, Alberta, Canada, a hamlet
 Mount Cayley, a volcano in southwestern British Columbia, Canada
 Cayley Glacier, Graham Land, Antarctica
 Cayley (crater), a lunar crater

Other uses
 Cayley baronets, a title in the Baronetage of England
 Cayley computer algebra system, designed to solve mathematical problems, particularly in group theory

See also
 W. Cayley Hamilton (died 1891), Canadian barrister and politician
 Caylee (name), given name
 Cèilidh, traditional Scottish or Irish social gathering
 Kaylee, given name
 Kaley (disambiguation)
 Kayleigh (disambiguation)